Phayre's squirrel (Callosciurus phayrei) is a species of rodent in the family Sciuridae. It is found in forests in China (Yunnan only) and Myanmar.

References

Thorington, R. W. Jr. and R. S. Hoffman. 2005. Family Sciuridae. pp. 754–818 in Mammal Species of the World a Taxonomic and Geographic Reference. D. E. Wilson and D. M. Reeder eds. Johns Hopkins University Press, Baltimore.

Callosciurus
Mammals described in 1855
Taxa named by Edward Blyth
Taxonomy articles created by Polbot